The Taifa of Saltés and Huelva was a medieval Arab  taifa kingdom that existed in southern Iberia from around 1012 to 1051.  From 1051 until 1091 it was under the forcible control of Seville, by Abbad II al-Mu'tadid.

The geographer al-Bakri (d. 1094) was born in the taifa of Saltés and Huelva.

List of Emirs

Bakrid dynasty
'Abd al-'Aziz 'Izz ad-Dawla: 1012/3–1051/2 or 53

References

1051 disestablishments
Saltes
States and territories established in the 1010s
Taifas in Portugal
11th century in Portugal
Arab dynasties